Arne Johnson Solhaug, (born 25 September 1942 in Østre Toten, Norway) is assistant professor at Norges Musikkhøgskole, cantor of Grønland Church in Oslo, author and composer.

Compositions (selected) 
 Lat oss prise Gud, vår Fader (NoS 282) (1979)
 For Guds folk er hvilen tilbake : for blandet kor : SATB (2004)
 Jeg åpner din kimono : for blandet kor : SATB (2004)
 For Guds folk er hvilen tilbake : for blandet kor : SATB (2004)
 Jesus Kristus ble lydig til døden : motett for Palmesøndag : for blandet kor SATB (2005)
 Kyrie : liturgisk salme for blandet kor : SATB (2006)

Bibliography
 Fra organist til kantor : utviklingen av en ny kirkemusikeridentitet – (2002)
 Et luthersk graduale-håndskrift fra 1500-tallet : spor av Nidarostradisjon i Island – (2003)

References 
 Store norske leksikon

Norwegian organists
Male organists
Norwegian non-fiction writers
Norwegian composers
Norwegian male composers
1942 births
Living people
21st-century organists
21st-century Norwegian male musicians
People from Østre Toten